Rohtak district is a district in the Indian state of Haryana. It is located in the southeast of Haryana and northwest of Delhi, bounded by Jind and Sonipat districts to the north, Jhajjar and Sonipat districts to the east, and Hissar, Charkhi Dadri, and Bhiwani districts to the west. Rohtak city is the district headquarters.

Divisions 
The district consists of two sub-divisions, Rohtak and Meham. Rohtak tehsil is further divided into three community development blocks, Rohtak, Kalanaur and Sampla. Meham tehsil is further divided into two community development blocks, Meham and Lakhan-Majra.

Economy 
The economy of the district is primarily agricultural. About 42.18 of the total workers are engaged in agriculture and allied activities, 7.68% in cottage and household industries and the rest in other activities.. Education and health are other emerging sectors in the city. The city hosts the world's leading precision screw manufacturing facilities, which supplies screws to domestic and international markets. The city has dairies and a sugar mill. Rohtak City is also a regional center for textile and gold jewellery making.

Japanese township 
The Japanese township is planned to be set up near Madina village,  from Rohtak city Ashoka, along NH9 towards Meham.  It will include several big industries and commercial offices.

Art and cultural heritage 

The art and architectural heritage of the town is in utter neglect. Until a decade ago, the old city alleys and railway road had about 50 havelis (mansions) built in traditional architectural styles. Many stone facades with carvings and motifs were stripped from the walls and sold to heritage traders for paltry sums. Muslim masons did all the decorative work in stone and fabricated woodcrafted door sets in these havelis. The rise of commerce and paucity of space forced the owners to demolish the old structures for building shopping complexes. There is no policy with the state government or city fathers to protect the heritage of the city. In spite of a local chapter of Indian National Trust for Art and Cultural Heritage (INTACH) functioning in the district, not much except listing of valuable properties could be done because most heritage properties are in private ownership and INTACH's local chapter does not have funds or the infrastructure to carry out listing and conservation work.

However, Ranbir Singh, a cultural historian and formerly co-convenor of the state chapter of INTACH, functioning from Rohtak, has documented extensively in the last 25 years the art and architectural heritage not only of the Rohtak District but also the entire Haryana on his own. He has a large collection of photographs of the heritage properties besides documenting history of the heritage value buildings, historical villages and towns of the district. Early in 2009, Singh completed detailed profiles of about 40 heritage value properties both in private as well as public domain with photographs and handed over the documents to the convener of the Haryana chapter of INTACH. This documentation, appreciated both by architects as well as art historians, has also been placed for reference in the archives in the central library of INTACH Headquarters located at Lodi Estate, New Delhi.

Architectural descriptions of several properties including many topics that belong to the life and culture of the people of Haryana have been published in an illustrated book, Traditions of North India - Art, Crafts and Architecture of Haryana, authored by Bhup Singh Gulia and edited and contributed by Ranbir Singh. A couple of illustrated articles on the old skills of woodcrafts persons of Haryana are under consideration of publication in Marg, a magazine on art and culture. This magazine also published his illustrated article on the antiquity of Farrukhnagar (dist. Gurgaon) in issue No.63 (2).

The 12th-century Asthal Bohar Monastery has also been modernized by its present Mahant Chand Nath. The oldest shrine at this place was built above the Smadh of Sidh Baba Chaurangi Nath (Bhagat Pooran Mall, son of Raja Shalivan of Sialkot, now in Pakistan) under which also lay the grave of Sidh Baba Masth Nath who lived in the mid-eighteenth century AD. The shrine of Sidh Baba Tota Nath, in this campus, had frescoes painted in the early nineteenth century and done in Rajput style. Some of these near the dome have had the colors chipped off and are fading fast.  The present Mahant was indifferent to the preservation of these fine frescoes, which are very important for art historians. In January 2012, Chand Nath, the present Mahant of the Mutt, had all the old memorial chhatris that belonged to Siddh Baba Mast Nath, Tota Nath, Megh Nath, Mohar Nath and Chet Nath demolished in one go to create way for a fabulously planned temple structure to be raised on the same lines as that of Akshardham at Delhi. Along with these, the old vestiges of frescoes in the chhatris too are gone. It is heartening to note the monuments and frescoes were preserved as images by Ranbir Singh, the renowned cultural historian of Haryana.

Similarly, in 2007, the carved stone facade of the Digambar Jain Mandir in Barra Bazar was stripped off and sold just for Rs.1 lakh (about US $2500) in the year 2006. It was a precious piece of art. Several havelis situated in the old city and railway road are giving way to modern buildings, thus depriving the city of its traditional and character. Many large villages around Rohtak city could boast of many fine buildings that had decorative elements and traditional architecture. Now, these are in bad condition and crumbling.

Demographics 

According to the 2011 census Rohtak district had a population of 1,061,204, roughly equal to the nation of Cyprus or the US state of Rhode Island. This gives it a ranking of 428th in India (out of a total of 640). Its population growth rate over the decade 2001-2011 was 12.61%. Rohtak had a sex ratio of 947 females for every 1000 males, and a literacy rate of 80.4%. Scheduled Castes make up 20.44% of the population.

Out of the total geographical area of the district, 83% is under cultivation. The main crops are wheat, gram, sugarcane and bajra. There is no perennial river in the district. However, the district has many canals.

Languages 

At the time of the 2011 Census of India, 76.94% of the population in the district spoke Haryanvi, 17.87% Hindi and 3.95% Punjabi as their first language.

Religion

Education
The Indian Institute of Management Rohtak was established in 2010. Maharishi Dayanand University in Rohtak city was established in 1976. There are 22 colleges within the city, including four engineering colleges and two polytechnics for technical education. Recently several educational institutions offering various technical and engineering courses including B.Ed. have come up in the district. Rohtak has the best medical college and health university in the state, Pt. B.D.Sharma University of Health Sciences, which recently become 2nd top medical college in India, offers all the medical courses including M.B.B.S, M.D, M.S, D.M, MCH and B.D.S, MDS.

The city has both state-run and private schools.

Transport
Rohtak is well connected by a rail and road network to neighbouring cities and states. It is located on the National Highway 9, which is just 70 km away from the national capital, Delhi. 
NH 71 A is also its lifeline and forms one of the main commercial roads of India on which thousands of heavy vehicles and cars ply daily.

Rohtak is also a railway junction and is connected by railway to Delhi, Chandigarh via Gohana, Jind, Bhiwani, and Rewari vai Jhajjar. In the railway budget of 2012-13, the government of India approved a direct railway line connection between Rohtak and Hansi, via its Meham tehsil.

See also
 Rithal
 Ambala
 Gochhi
Chiri Village

References

External links

 Official website
 http://rohtakcity.com
 

 
Districts of Haryana